There have been three NASCAR Busch Series races named Pepsi 200:

 Pepsi 200 (South Boston), run at South Boston Speedway in 1986
 Pepsi 200 (Hickory), run at Hickory Motor Speedway in 1988 and 1989
 Pepsi 200 presented by DeVilbiss, run at Michigan International Speedway in 1998